Matt Firth is a professional rugby league footballer who played in the 2000s.

Club career
Firth played for Halifax in the 2000 Super League V and the 2001 Super League VI.

References

External links
Roll of Honour, Stanley Rangers ARLFC

Halifax R.L.F.C. players
Hunslet R.L.F.C. players
Keighley Cougars players
Living people
Place of birth missing (living people)
Rochdale Hornets players
Rugby league five-eighths
Rugby league halfbacks
Rugby league hookers
English rugby league players
1981 births